János Füzi (de Homoródkarácsonyfalva) (1776 – Kolozsvár, 6 October 1833) was a Unitarian minister, teacher.

Life
He was the elder brother of Ferenc Füzi. He studied in Székelykeresztúr and Kolozsvár. Later he studied at the University of Göttingen. He didn't have to pay any tuition fee. When he arrived home, he started to teach philosophy in the Unitarian College of Kolozsvár. At the same time he served as a priest too. He was awarded as a priest in 1824. At the same time he was a general notarius. He had a stroke in 1830 so he couldn't work as a priest or teacher. He wrote textbooks, which are available as manuscripts.

Sources

Hungarian Unitarians
Hungarian academics
Hungarian Protestant ministers and clergy
People from Harghita County
1776 births
1833 deaths